Monan may refer to:
 Monan (saint) (fl. 6th–7th century), Irish saint
 Monan, Punjab, village in Jhelum District, Punjab, Pakistan
 Monan Patera, a crater on Io
 St Monans, town in Fife, Scotland
 Monan, Hebei (陌南镇), town in Xian County, Hebei, China
 Monan, Shanxi (陌南镇), town in Ruicheng County, Shanxi, China
 Monan, an oil field located in the Eastern Trough Area Project in the North Sea